Zanganeh may refer to:

Zangana, a Kurdish tribe in western Iran and Iraq
Zanganeh, a place in West Azerbaijan Province, Iran.
Zangeneh (disambiguation), places in Iran
Lila Azam Zanganeh, French writer
Pari Zanganeh, Iranian singer